Thomas Walther is a Grand Prix motorcycle racer from Germany.

Career statistics

By season

Races by year
(key)

References

External links
  Profile on motogp.com

German motorcycle racers
Living people
1977 births
250cc World Championship riders